Joseph Pearkes Fox Gundry  (29 July 1837 – 11 November 1891) was an English first-class cricketer.

The son of Joseph Gundry senior, he was born at Bridport in July 1837. He was educated at Winchester College, before going up to Merton College, Oxford. He made his debut in first-class cricket during his second year at Oxford, when he played for a combined Gentlemen of Kent and Sussex team against the Gentlemen of England at Lord's in 1857. His second first-class appearance came during his fourth year at Oxford, when he played for Oxford University against the Marylebone Cricket Club at Oxford in 1859. 

After graduating from Oxford, Pearkes entered into the family business in Bridport manufacturing fishing nets and twine. He also served as a first lieutenant in the Bridport Artillery Volunteers, having joined in February 1860. Pearkes served as a justice of the peace for Dorset. A master of the Cattistock Hunt, he was killed in a riding accident while out with the hunt on 11 November 1891.

References

External links

1837 births
1891 deaths
People from Bridport
Cricketers from Dorset
People educated at Winchester College
Alumni of Merton College, Oxford
English cricketers
Oxford University cricketers
Gentlemen of Kent and Sussex cricketers
English justices of the peace
Deaths by horse-riding accident in England
Hunting accident deaths